The Link was established in July 1937 as an "independent non-party organisation to promote Anglo-German friendship". It generally operated as a cultural organisation, although its journal, the Anglo-German Review, reflected the pro-Nazi views of Barry Domvile, and particularly in London it attracted a number of anti-semites and pro-Nazis. At its height the membership numbered around 4,300.

The Link opposed war between Britain and Germany, and because of this attracted the support of some British pacifists. When The Link and the Anglo-German Review were included among peace organisations across the political spectrum in the Peace Service Handbook (a publication put out by the Peace Pledge Union), The Daily Telegraph and the News Chronicle published articles accusing the PPU of supporting Nazism. In response, PPU member Stuart Morris wrote to the papers stating there was no connection between the PPU and The Link, and that the former organisation did not support the German demand for colonies or peace at the expense of smaller nations. The PPU also sent a letter to its group leaders dissociating The Link from the PPU, and ceased publishing the Peace Service Handbook.

The organisation was investigated by Maxwell Knight, head of counter-subversion in MI5. The organisation closed shortly after the start of World War II in 1939.

Barry Domvile was interned in 1940 under Defence Regulation 18B, as someone who might be "prejudicial to the public safety or the defence of the realm".

According to Anthony Masters, the Link was allegedly resurrected in 1940 by Ian Fleming, then working in the Department of Naval Intelligence, in order to successfully lure Rudolf Hess (deputy party leader and third in leadership of Germany, after Adolf Hitler and Hermann Göring) to Britain in May 1941.

See also
 Anglo-German Fellowship

References

1937 establishments in the United Kingdom
Fascist organizations
Far-right politics in the United Kingdom
Germany–United Kingdom relations
Organizations established in 1937